Porphyrosela alternata is a moth of the family Gracillariidae. It is known from Japan (the island of Kyūshū), Malaysia (the states of Pahang and Selangor), Nepal and Taiwan. This species is a well-known pest of cotton.

The wingspan is 2.6-4.3 mm.

The larvae feed on Desmodium species, including Desmodium heterocarpon, Desmodium heterophyllum and Desmodium strigillosum. They mine the leaves of their host plant. The mine has the form of an irregular linear-blotch-mine occurring upon the upper side of the leaflet; it is usually started as a linear, flat type, then suddenly widened into a blotch, nearly occupying the whole surface of a small leaflet. The mining part is whitish-green with an irregular brownish line of frass at young stage, and discoloured into brownish at mature stage. When completed, the upper epidermis on the blotch-part is strongly contracted with silken threads to form an upward-folded leaflet. The larvae are often gregarious.

References

Lithocolletinae
Moths of Japan
Moths described in 1993

Taxa named by Tosio Kumata
Moths of Malaysia
Moths of Taiwan
Lepidoptera of Nepal
Leaf miners